Philippe Charles Lucien Christanval (born 31 August 1978) is a French former professional footballer who played as a centre-back. During his career, he played top-flight football in France, Spain and England, and earned six full international caps, as well as a selection to the 2002 FIFA World Cup.

Early life
Christanval was born in Paris.

Club career

Monaco
Christanval's career began at AS Monaco in 1999, where he made 81 appearances, scoring one goal. They won the 1999–2000 league title, earning him the title of Young Player of the Year, and he made several UEFA Champions League appearances. In January 2001, it was reported that Monaco were considering exchanging him for Frank LeBoeuf of Chelsea.

Barcelona and Marseille
Christanval was then signed by Barcelona of Spain's La Liga for a £6.5 million fee in June 2001, the team he supported as a child. After being released from Barcelona in 2003, he joined Marseille on 18 July on a four-year contract. They reached the 2004 UEFA Cup Final in his first season, but he was an unused substitute as they lost 2–0 to Valencia.

Fulham
After two weeks on trial at Arsenal, their manager Arsène Wenger opted not to sign Christanval. He then joined another Premier League London team, Fulham, on 9 September 2005. Upon his signing, manager Chris Coleman stated:

In his first appearances at Fulham, he found himself playing in defensive midfield with Papa Bouba Diop. He was later moved back to his typical position. His only Premier League goal was a late equaliser in a 3–3 draw with West Ham United on 13 January 2007.

In the 2007–08 season he made a single substitute appearance. At the end of the season, Christanval was released by Fulham and was offered a trial with Premier League club Blackburn Rovers. On 9 April 2009, Christanval retired from football, having been unable to find a new club.

International career
Christanval was part of the France squad at the 1997 FIFA World Youth Championship.

He made his full debut on 7 October 2000, in a 0–0 friendly draw away to South Africa. Christanval played four more friendlies in 2002 before his last appearance, a 2–1 away win against Cyprus in qualification for UEFA Euro 2004. He was selected for the 2002 FIFA World Cup but did not enter the field of play.

Personal life
An artificial pitch in his native Sarcelles was named after Christanval.

Honours
Monaco
Division 1: 1999–2000
Trophée des Champions: 2000

Marseille
UEFA Cup runner-up: 2003–04

Individual
UNFP Ligue 1 Young Player of the Year: 2000

References

External links

1978 births
Living people
Footballers from Paris
French footballers
Association football defenders
INF Clairefontaine players
AS Monaco FC players
FC Barcelona players
Olympique de Marseille players
Fulham F.C. players
Ligue 1 players
La Liga players
Premier League players
France youth international footballers
France international footballers
2002 FIFA World Cup players
French expatriate footballers
Expatriate footballers in England
Expatriate footballers in Monaco
Expatriate footballers in Spain
French expatriate sportspeople in England
French expatriate sportspeople in Monaco
French expatriate sportspeople in Spain
Black French sportspeople